Ironclad is a 2011 British action adventure war film directed by Jonathan English. Written by English and Erick Kastel, based on a screenplay by Stephen McDool, the cast includes James Purefoy, Brian Cox, Kate Mara, Paul Giamatti, Vladimir Kulich, Mackenzie Crook, Jason Flemyng, Derek Jacobi, and Charles Dance. The film chronicles the siege of Rochester Castle by King John in 1215. The film was shot entirely in Wales in 2009 and produced on a budget of $25 million.

Plot
A prologue describes how the barons of England, aided by the Knights Templar, fought against tyrannical King John in a war that lasted more than three years. It ended with the King signing Magna Carta, a document granting rights to all English freemen.

King John regrets succumbing to the pressure of the barons to sign Magna Carta.  Soon after, he hires an army of pagan Danish mercenaries under the leadership of a warlord, Captain Tiberius, to restore John's absolute authority over the kingdom, under the presumption that the Pope has agreed to keep Christian missionaries out of their lands in Denmark.

The Abbot Marcus leads three Templar knights (who have taken vows of silence) on a pilgrimage to Canterbury and they take shelter from the rain at Darnay Castle. One of the knights, Thomas Marshall, is assured by the abbot that Marshall's release from the Templar Order will be sought at Canterbury. By morning, King John arrives at the castle with his army and mercenaries. Baron Darnay signed Magna Carta and in retribution John orders him hanged. The Abbot attempts to intervene and the King orders that the abbot's tongue be cut off. Marshall and the two other knights fight the Danes, during which Marshall escapes the castle on horseback carrying the abbot; the two knights left behind are slain. The abbot dies before night of his wound, and Marshall breaks his vow of silence to swear that his sacrifice will not be in vain.

Once he has reached Canterbury, Marshall meets with Archbishop Langton, the author of Magna Carta, and Baron William d'Aubigny, a former soldier turned wool merchant. Langton reveals that the Pope has sided with King John and that he himself is to be excommunicated for writing Magna Carta. The three men agree that John must be stopped, and that the place to do so is Rochester Castle, the seat of Baron Cornhill and a strategic stronghold that controls southern England and allows access to London and the rest of the country.

d'Aubigny persuades three of his men to join him, including his squire, Guy, and a petty criminal named Jedediah, but a fourth turns down the baron's call to arms. A party of seven finally leaves for Rochester where, on arriving, they discover several Danish mercenaries have already claimed the castle; the fourth man had betrayed them to the king. Aubigny's party fights and kills the Danes, and then claim Rochester Castle in the name of the rebellion, much to the displeasure of Cornhill. When John's army finally arrives and lays siege to Rochester, the garrison holds fast and manages to beat the initial Danish assault. In the aftermath, Aubigny offers his men leave if they wish; none accept.

A second assault sees the Danes' siege tower destroyed by a trebuchet crafted by the defenders from within the castle. John's forces then attempt to starve out the defenders. The Archbishop is informed that Prince Louis is biding his time in France and negotiating with John, and sets off in haste to expedite affairs. As the season turns to winter, the hunger of the castle's occupants continue; Marshall leaves the castle under cover of night and then returns ahead of his pursuers with food stolen from the Danish camp. The castle morale is bolstered by Marshall's act and he gives in to the advances of Cornhill's young wife Isabel, breaking his Templar vows.

The Danish leader, Tiberius, threatened by John to take the castle or risk the King reneging on their bargain, adopts a different approach in his next attack and manages to sneak a small force of men over the walls before dawn to open the castle gates from within. Guy discovers the infiltrators and sounds the alarm, but it is too late. Tiberius leads the charge into the castle grounds while his Danes slaughter the garrison. During the chaos, d'Aubigny is wounded and left behind in the chaos of the retreat. Marshall recovers in time to don his knight's battle armour and charge the Danes on his war-horse, buying time for the survivors to pull back to the keep.

Aubigny is dragged before the King and forced to watch as the hands of two prisoners are chopped off. After a defiant verbal exchange with John, he is subjected to the same fate and then hurled by the castle trebuchet into a keep wall. Cornhill tries to surrender but is stopped; he goes instead upstairs to his bedroom and hangs himself. John's engineers have been preparing a mine under the keep's foundation, and they have a herd of pigs brought and put in the mine which is then stoked, set afire and the animal fat used to damage the keep's foundation, causing it to collapse; as the keep's walls come down, the final assault begins.

The last defenders are killed except Guy, Isabel and Marshall, the latter knocked unconscious by falling rubble. Guy goes out to die fighting where he encounters Tiberius and is almost killed, until a recovered Marshall intervenes. Tiberius challenges Marshall to single combat, and Marshall triumphs after a long and savage duel. Horns are heard in the distance as the combined English rebel and French army arrives at last, and John and the remaining Danes disperse in panic. Marshall meets Prince Louis and Archbishop Langton at the castle gates; the latter tells him that he is now free of the Templar Order. Acknowledging England's new king with a nod, Marshall rides off with Isabel, while Guy tells his dead baron that "We held".

The epilogue describes King John's death during his retreat and the reconstruction of Rochester Castle, and how it, like Magna Carta, still stands.

Cast

 James Purefoy as Thomas Marshall, a disillusioned Templar Knight and former Crusader who seeks release from his Order
 Brian Cox as William d'Aubigny, an ennobled wool merchant who opposes King John's tyranny
 Derek Jacobi as Reginald de Cornhill, lord of Rochester Castle
 Kate Mara as Lady Isabel, Cornhill's young and neglected wife
 Paul Giamatti as King John of England
 Charles Dance as Stephen Langton, Archbishop of Canterbury
 Jason Flemyng as Becket, a nihilistic warrior and one of d'Aubigny's mercenaries
 Jamie Foreman as Jedediah Coteral, a prisoner freed by d'Aubigny to join the rebellion
 Mackenzie Crook as Daniel Marks, an expert archer and one of d'Aubigny's mercenaries
 Rhys Parry Jones as Wulfstan, a brutish warrior and one of d'Aubigny's mercenaries
 Aneurin Barnard as Guy, d'Aubigny's idealistic young squire
 Vladimir Kulich as Tiberius, captain of King John's Danish mercenaries
 David Melville as Baron Darnay, lord of Darnay Castle and a supporter of the rebellion
 Daniel O'Meara as Phipps, captain of the Rochester Castle garrison
 Annabelle Apsion as Maddy
 Steffan Rhodri as Cooper
 Bree Condon as Agnes

Production
Actress Megan Fox was attached to the film when the film's production company, Mythic, began promoting it to investors at the 2008 Cannes Film Festival. Fox left the film and was later replaced by Kate Mara. Due to the decreased amount of credit and financing available in 2009, the budget of the film was reduced and the entire supporting cast was changed, with the exception of actors James Purefoy and Paul Giamatti. Producer Andrew Curtis described the financing of the film as "more complex than a London Underground map" to Variety magazine; the film ended up crediting 18 executive producers.

Principal photography for the film began at Dragon International Film Studios near the village Llanharan in Wales on 9 October 2009. A replica of Rochester Castle was built on the studio complex. Producer Rick Benattar strove to make the film as historically accurate as possible, recreating the historical violent siege of Rochester Castle, and letting viewers experience the battle as if they were there. Ironclad was the largest independent production that has been filmed in Wales, and was among the largest independent films shot in Britain in 2009.

Fictional elements
The film is only loosely based on reality. d'Aubigny commanded the garrison but contemporary chroniclers do not agree on how many men it consisted of. Estimates range from 95 to 140 knights supported by crossbowmen, sergeants, and others. John did take the castle, most of the higher nobles being imprisoned or banished; and the French did not arrive in England until some six months after the siege had ended. Characters departing significantly from the historical record include d'Aubigny, who was not an ennobled wool merchant (nor was he tortured and killed in the siege).

The closing narration explains that this was one of the first victories that the French had that would eventually lead to total victory. However, not mentioned in the narration was that after John's death in 1216, many of the English rebels preferred a weak English king in the person of nine-year-old Henry III over an experienced French monarch and thus rallied around Henry. The rebellion was defeated by royalist supporters in 1217.

While the castle itself is depicted realistically, the nearby Norman cathedral and the city of Rochester itself are completely missing from the location shots.  In reality, the cathedral is only a few hundred yards from the castle walls and Rochester has been a substantial settlement since Roman times.

The film's Danes are depicted as Hungarian-speaking Viking-like pagans when Denmark had been Christianized by that time. Also, King John's mercenaries were mostly Flemish, Provençals and Aquitainians, not Danes.

Thomas Marshal, the main character played by James Purefoy, is based loosely upon medieval knight and statesman William Marshal.

The movie has the Knights Templar as amongst the ringleaders in the battle against John Lackland. In reality, the Templars and King John had a cordial relation and they were one of the few powerful groups in England which John did not offend or alienate during his reign, and the order was amongst his financial backers providing him with the necessary funds to wage war.

Reception
On Rotten Tomatoes the film has an approval rating of  based on reviews from  critics. The site's critical consensus reads, "Ironclad serves up plenty of crunchy gore to sate action aficionados, but the sketchy story clunks like a suit of ill-fitting armor."

Manohla Dargis, writing from The New York Times criticized the film for its emphasis on violent action scenes above a cohesive plot, stating that " “Ironclad” alternately feels, plays and sounds like an abridged television mini-series and a feature-length video game," and that "the action is cluttered and the story overly compressed," but conceded that the film was enthusiastic in its pursuit of violence to entertain.

Sequel
A sequel called, Ironclad: Battle for Blood, was announced as in development shortly after the film's release. It is directed by Jonathan English and set five years after the end of the first film. In late 2013 a trailer was released, and the film was released in March 2014. The sequel went on to receive negative reviews, with a Rotten Tomatoes score of 17% and many critics condemning the film for intensifying the faults from its predecessor. Leslie Felperin from The Hollywood Reporter criticized the film for its decreased budget, less famous ensemble, and "sloppier" retelling of medieval history, but complimented the film on its musical score, stating that "Andreas Weidinger's orchestral score, featuring choral elements and plenty of brass, represents a redeeming feature."

See also
 List of historical drama films

References

External links
 

2011 films
2011 action drama films
2010s historical films
2011 independent films
2011 war drama films
Action films based on actual events
2010s action war films
American independent films
American war drama films
British action drama films
British historical films
British independent films
British war drama films
Drama films based on actual events
Epic films based on actual events
Films about death
Films about violence
Films set in castles
Films set in Kent
Films shot in Wales
Films set in the 13th century
English-language German films
German independent films
German war drama films
Historical epic films
Historical action films
Siege films
War epic films
War films based on actual events
Films scored by Lorne Balfe
American action war films
British action war films
Warner Bros. films
Cultural depictions of John, King of England
2010s English-language films
Films directed by Jonathan English
2010s American films
2010s British films
2010s German films